League tables for teams participating in Kolmonen, the fourth tier of the Finnish soccer league system, in 2009.

2009 League tables

Helsinki and Uusimaa

Section 1

Section 2

Section 3

South-East Finland (Kaakkois-Suomi)

Central and Eastern Finland (Keski- and Itä-Suomi)

Northern Finland (Pohjois-Suomi)

Central Ostrobothnia and Vaasa (Keski-Pohjanmaa and Vaasa)

Satakunta

Tampere

Turku and Åland (Turku and Ahvenanmaa)

Footnotes

References and sources
Finnish FA
ResultCode
Kolmonen (jalkapallo) 

Kolmonen seasons
4
Finland
Finland